WIOE-FM is an oldies, classic hits, and classic top 40 formatted broadcast radio station licensed to South Whitley, Indiana, and serving Whitley, Kosciusko, Wabash, and Huntington counties in Indiana. WIOE-FM is owned and operated by Brian R. Walsh.

Programming

WIOE-FM features both professional announcers and student broadcasters from Warsaw Community High School. Warsaw Community High School athletics are also heard on the station.

WIOE-FM's news department prepares and broadcasts local news reports on the weekdays. The station also broadcasts the Sunday services of the First United Methodist Church located in Warsaw.

Sale of station
At 12:00 a.m. on Friday, March 6, 2015, the oldies, classic hits, and Classic Top 40 format of LPFM station WIOE-LP moved to commercial WMYQ. WIOE-LP fell silent with the frequency change.

On March 30, 2015, former WIOE-LP co-owner Brian R. Walsh purchased WMYQ from Larko Communications, Inc. for $220,000. Walsh entered into a time brokerage agreement with Larko Communications, Inc. on March 6, 2015 in order to begin operating the station.

The sale of WMYQ closed on August 5, 2015. The station's callsign was changed from WMYQ to WIOE on August 19, 2015, and then to WIOE-FM on July 30, 2019.

References

External links
Oldies 101.1 & 104.3 WIOE online

Classic hits radio stations in the United States
Oldies radio stations in the United States
Radio stations established in 1993
IOE-FM
1993 establishments in Indiana